Modena is an unincorporated community in Stark County, Illinois, United States. located  north of Wyoming.

History
A post office called Modena was established in 1861, and remained in operation until 1906. The community was named after Modena, in Italy.

References

Unincorporated communities in Stark County, Illinois
Unincorporated communities in Illinois
Peoria metropolitan area, Illinois